Glyceridae is a family of polychaete worms. They are commonly referred to as beak-thrower worms or bloodworms. They are bright red, segmented, aquatic worms. The proboscis worm Glycera is sometimes called bloodworm. The Glyceridae are epi- and infaunal polychaetes that prey upon small invertebrates. They are errant burrowers that build galleries of interconnected tubes to aid in catching their prey.

Characteristics
Pointy snout used for burrowing in sediment
No septa in anterior part of bodies
Rely on peristalsis to move
Explosively evert pharynx into sediment, anchor position with prostomium and pull body forward. 
Eversible pharynx also used in prey capture: 4 poisonous fangs

References

Phyllodocida
Annelid families